Nikica “Dido” Milenković (born 30 September 1959) is a Croatian professional football manager and former player.

Playing career
Milenković last played for Sabadell in Spain’s Segunda División. He had spent much of his career playing for Rijeka in the Yugoslav First League, where he amassed 154 league appearances. After a season with Čelik Zenica, he moved to Spain where he played until he retired in 1991.

Managerial career
Initially, after retiring, Milenković settled in Barcelona where he worked in the youth ranks of FC Barcelona and as a FIFA agent from 1991 until 1996. He then moved to Rijeka where he worked as director of football.

In June 2021, Milenković became the new manager of newly promoted Bosnian Premier League club Rudar Prijedor. He debuted as manager against Sloboda Tuzla with a loss, in a league game on 18 July 2021. Milenković guided the team to his first win as manager in a league game against Velež Mostar on 2 August 2021. He left Rudar in October 2021.

Career statistics
Source:

Managerial statistics

References

1959 births
Living people
People from Crikvenica
Association football defenders
Yugoslav footballers
HNK Orijent players
HNK Rijeka players
NK Čelik Zenica players
Real Burgos CF footballers
CE Sabadell FC footballers
Yugoslav First League players
Segunda División players
Yugoslav expatriate footballers
Expatriate footballers in Spain
Yugoslav expatriate sportspeople in Spain
Croatian football managers
FK Rudar Prijedor managers
Premier League of Bosnia and Herzegovina managers
Expatriate football managers in Bosnia and Herzegovina
Croatian expatriate sportspeople in Bosnia and Herzegovina
FC Barcelona non-playing staff
HNK Rijeka non-playing staff
Croatian expatriate sportspeople in Spain